The 7th Legislative Assembly of Saskatchewan was elected in the Saskatchewan general election held in June 1929. The assembly sat from September 4, 1929, to May 25, 1934. The Liberal Party led by James Garfield Gardiner attempted to form a minority government but were defeated by a motion of no confidence. The Conservative Party led by James Thomas Milton Anderson then formed a coalition government with the support of the Progressive Party and independent members. The Liberals led by Gardiner formed the official opposition.

James Fraser Bryant served as speaker for the assembly in 1929. Robert Sterritt Leslie replaced Bryant as speaker in 1930.

Members of the Assembly 
The following members were elected to the assembly in 1929:

Notes:

Party standings 

Notes:

By-elections 
By-elections were held to replace members for various reasons:

Notes:

References 

Terms of the Saskatchewan Legislature